The 2021 IIHF World Championship took place from 21 May to 6 June 2021. It was originally to be co-hosted by Minsk, Belarus and Riga, Latvia, as the IIHF announced on 19 May 2017 in Cologne, Germany. Their joint bid won by a very tight margin against the Finnish bid with the cities of Tampere and Helsinki. On 18 January 2021 the IIHF decided to remove Belarus as a co-host due to the rising political unrest there. On 2 February, the IIHF voted to confirm Latvia as the sole host for the 2021 IIHF World Championship.

This tournament was notable for the number of upsets that occurred in the preliminary round, including Denmark and Belarus' victories over Sweden, Kazakhstan's victory over Finland, Slovakia's victory over Russia, and Latvia's victory over Canada. Sweden did not qualify for the quarterfinals for the first time since the current format has been introduced. On the other hand, Kazakhstan recorded their best World Championship result to date, finishing tenth, while only narrowly missing their first ever play-off appearance.

Canada won their 27th title, after defeating Finland in the final in overtime. Canada was the first team in history to win gold despite losing four times during the tournament. The United States won the bronze medal game, defeating Germany 6–1.

Venues
The Minsk Arena was originally planned to be used for the Championship.

COVID-19 restrictions 
Due to COVID-19 pandemic protocols, the tournament was initially held behind closed doors with no spectators. Prior to the beginning of the tournament, and against objections by Prime Minister Krišjānis Kariņš and Minister of Health Daniels Pavļuts, the Latvian parliament voted in favour of a notion ordering the government to develop a plan for allowing spectators who are either fully vaccinated or otherwise immune due to recent infection.

Spectators were admitted beginning June 1, and were to present electronic verification that they have either been fully vaccinated no fewer than 14 days prior with the Janssen, Moderna, or Pfizer vaccine, been fully vaccinated with the AstraZeneca vaccine, have received the first dose of the AstraZeneca vaccine between 22 and 90 days prior, or have recently recovered from COVID-19. Arēna Rīga was capped at 2,660 spectators, and the Olympic Sports Centre at 1,058. Face masks were mandatory.

Belarus hosting controversy
Despite similar political opposition in 2014 when Belarus was the sole host of the IIHF World Championship, Belarus was to be the co-host for the 2021 Championship. However, in the wake of the ongoing 2020–2021 Belarusian protests, several political groups, politicians and international entities, including the European Parliament and Krišjānis Kariņš, the Prime Minister of Latvia, which was set to co-host the championship, protested tournament matches being held in Belarus, and called for the country to be stripped of co-hosting duties. Several sponsors of the tournament reportedly threatened to withdraw from sponsoring the event if it took place in Belarus.

On January 18, 2021, the IIHF, citing "safety and security issues," decided that the World Championship would not be played in Belarus. Latvia would remain as a co-host for the time being, but the IIHF was considering whether to go with another site, due to COVID-19 constraints and the desirability for single-site travel. Both Denmark and Slovakia (the tournament hosts in 2018 and 2019 respectively) reportedly offered to step in as hosts. An offer from Lithuania was declined by both the IIHF and the Latvian Ice Hockey Federation.

Belarus flag controversy

On May 24, 2021, following the Ryanair Flight 4978 incident, Latvian officials replaced the Belarusian state flag in Riga with the former flag faced with the former coat of arms used by opposition groups, including at the 2021 IIHF World Championship display of flags, which was replaced by Mayor of Riga Mārtiņš Staķis and Minister of Foreign Affairs of Latvia Edgars Rinkēvičs. As a result, Belarus expelled the entire Latvian embassy from their country. The IIHF issued a statement protesting the replacement of the flag, and IIHF president René Fasel asked Riga's mayor to remove the IIHF name, flag and symbols from such sites, or to restore the flag, insisting that the IIHF is an "apolitical sports organization". In response, Staķis said he would remove the IIHF flags.  On May 28, 2021, Belarus opened a criminal case against Staķis and Rinkēvičs, accusing them of fuelling "national enmity".

Participants

Qualified as host

Automatic qualifier after the cancellation of the 2020 IIHF World Championship

 (originally co-host)

1

1 Pursuant to a December 2020 ruling by the Court of Arbitration for Sport on doping sanctions, Russian athletes and teams are prohibited from competing under the Russian flag or using the Russian national anthem at any Olympic Games or world championships through 16 December 2022, and must compete as "neutral athlete[s]." For IIHF tournaments, the Russian team will play under the name "Russian Olympic Committee" (ROC). Instead of the Russian national anthem being played at the 2021 World Championship, Piano Concerto No.1 by Pyotr Illych Tchaikovsky was played.

Seeding
The seedings in the preliminary round are based on the 2020 IIHF World Ranking, as of the end of the 2019 IIHF World Championship, using the serpentine system with a swap between Canada and ROC to "accommodate special organizational needs".

Group A
 (2)
 (4)
 (5)
 (8)
 (9)
 (12)
 (13)
 (19)

Group B
 (1)
 (3)
 (6)
 (7)
 (10)
 (11)
 (15)
 (16)

Rosters

Each team's roster consists of at least 15 skaters (forwards, and defencemen) and 2 goaltenders, and at most 25 skaters and 3 goaltenders. All 16 participating nations, through the confirmation of their respective national associations, had to submit a "Long List" no later than two weeks before the tournament, and a final roster by the Passport Control meeting prior to the start of the tournament.

Match officials
18 referees and linesmen were announced on 7 April 2021.

Mascot

The official mascot of the tournament was revealed in February 2020 by the IIHF. His name is Spiky the Hedgehog and he was voted by the fans in Belarus and Latvia. The hedgehog is a very popular animal in the hosting countries and it represents the fighting spirit and determination of the Belarus and Latvian national hockey teams.

Preliminary round
The groups were announced on 20 May 2020. The schedule was released on 5 February 2021.

Group A

Group B

Playoff round

Pairings
Quarter-finalists were paired according to their positions in the groups: the first-place team in each preliminary-round group played the fourth-place team of the other group, while the second-place team played the third-place team of the other group.

Semi-finalists are paired according to their seeding after the preliminary round, which is determined by the following criteria: 1)position in the group; 2)number of points; 3)goal difference; 4)number of goals scored for; 5)seeding number entering the tournament. The best-ranked semi-finalist plays against the lowest-ranked semi-finalist, while the second-best ranked semi-finalist plays the third-best ranked semi-finalist.

Bracket

Final

Final standings

Statistics

Scoring leaders
List shows the top skaters sorted by points, then goals.

GP = Games played; G = Goals; A = Assists; Pts = Points; +/− = Plus/Minus; PIM = Penalties in Minutes; POS = Position
Source: IIHF.com

Goaltending leaders
Only the top five goaltenders, based on save percentage, who have played at least 40% of their team's minutes, are included in this list.

TOI = time on ice (minutes:seconds); SA = shots against; GA = goals against; GAA = goals against average; Sv% = save percentage; SO = shutouts
Source: IIHF.com

Awards
The awards were announced on 6 June 2021.

Individual awards

Media All Stars

Broadcasting rights
These are the broadcasters for the tournament.

References

External links 
Official website

 
2021 Men
2021 in ice hockey
International ice hockey competitions hosted by Latvia
Sports competitions in Riga
Ice hockey in Riga
2020s in Riga
IIHF World Championship
IIHF World Championship
IIHF World Championship